Sanjeev Singh is an Indian politician and a member of the Bharatiya Janata Party. He was an elected member of the Jharkhand Legislative Assembly from the Jharia constituency in Dhanbad district. In the 2014 Jharkhand Assembly Elections, he defeated his nearest competitor, an Indian National Congress candidate, by more than 32,000 votes. He is currently serving a sentence in prison.

Singh Mansion 

Singh Mansion is the residence of Sanjeev Singh. His mother Kunti Devi, was elected to the Jharkhand Legislative Assembly, twice, in the 2005 and the 2009 Jharkhand Assembly elections, from the Jharia Constituency, on the ticket of the Bharatiya Janata Party. Remarkably, in the 2009 Jharkhand assembly elections Kunti Devi, Sanjeev Singh's mother emerged as the victorious candidate. It was the only victory for the Bharatiya Janata Party which had faced defeats in all the surrounding seats, such as Dhanbad, Sindri, Baghmara, Nirsa, Bokaro and Chandankiyari. In the 2019 Assembly Election his wife, Ragini Singh, lost to Purnima Neeraj Singh, widow of the Late Neeraj Singh.

Political History 
Sanjeev Singh's family has always been staunch opponents of the Indian National Congress. His father, the Late Suryadeo Singh, was elected as the Member of the Legislative Assembly continuously from the year 1977 to 1991, by defeating the candidates of the Indian National Congress, Sanjeev Singh is the most prominent leader of the Janta Mazdoor Sangh (affiliated to the Hind Mazdoor Sabha), which is the largest and the most influential trade union in Dhanbad and in the Bharat Coking Coal Limited. He is the Vice President of the Hind Mazdoor Sabha.

Political and Familial Turmoils 
On 11 April 2017, Sanjeev Singh, who was accused of the murder of his brother Neeraj Singh, an  Indian National Congress leader, and three others in a shootout in Dhanbad surrendered at the police station. The case is currently under trial at the Dhanbad District Court. The incident took place on 21 March 2017, and was perpetrated by unidentified motorcycle assassins at the Saraidhela Police Station, Dhanbad.

Janta Mazdoor Sangh 
The Janta Mazdoor Sangh is the largest and the most influential trade union in Dhanbad and in the Bharat Coking Coal Limited. The Sangh was founded by the Late Suryadeo Singh and is now headed by Sanjeev Singh. Sanjeev Singh is a member of the JBCCI (Joint Bipartite Committee for Coal Industry), where he represents the workmen and the Hind Mazdoor Sabha. At the behest of Singh, all the members and supporters of the Janta Mazdoor Sangh extended their support to the candidate of the BJP from Dhanbad, in the Lok Sabha Election, 2019, thereby ensuring BJP's victory.

References 

People from Dhanbad district
Bharatiya Janata Party politicians from Jharkhand
Members of the Jharkhand Legislative Assembly
Living people
21st-century Indian politicians
Year of birth missing (living people)
Jharkhand politicians
Indian politicians convicted of crimes
Indian people convicted of murder